Cholinobaris is a genus of flower weevils in the beetle family Curculionidae. There is one described species in Cholinobaris, C. rhomboidea.

References

Further reading

 
 
 

Baridinae
Monotypic weevil genera
Articles created by Qbugbot